Otolin is a glycoprotein found in the vertebrate inner ear.

Modifications
Otolin is modified after it is translated, with hydroxylated prolines and two glycosylated lysines with glucosyl-galactosyl groups.

Substructure
The gene for otolin in mice is on chromosome 3E12. In humans it is located at 3q26.1
At the N-terminal end there is a signal peptide. The N-terminal end has four cysteine residues. Adjacent to this is a stiff collagen domain with 75 Gly-X-Y repeats. It also contains a cysteine residue, and in human otolin, there are four cystein residues in this domain. At the opposite end is the C1q domain. The otolin gene in mammals contains four introns and five exons.

Superstructure
Otolin combines with several other otolin molecules to form an oligomer, probably a trimer. It also binds to otoconin-90 and cerebellin-1.

Production
Otolin is produced by the vestibular support cells in the utricle, saccule, the three semicircular canal cristae, and the tectorial membrane. In teleosts (fish), otolin is found in the otolith and it is required to anchor the otolith in position.

References

Glycoproteins